In differential topology, the Whitney immersion theorem (named after Hassler Whitney) states that for , any smooth -dimensional manifold (required also to be Hausdorff and second-countable) has a one-to-one immersion in Euclidean -space, and a (not necessarily one-to-one) immersion in -space. Similarly, every smooth -dimensional manifold can be immersed in the -dimensional sphere (this removes the  constraint).

Further results

The conjecture that every n-manifold immerses in  became known as the immersion conjecture.

See also
Whitney embedding theorem

References

External links 
  (Exposition of Cohen's work)

Theorems in differential topology